Giuseppe Steiner (23 August 1929 – 1 April 2007) was an Italian cross-country skier. He competed at the 1960 Winter Olympics and the 1964 Winter Olympics.

References

External links
 

1929 births
2007 deaths
Italian male cross-country skiers
Olympic cross-country skiers of Italy
Cross-country skiers at the 1960 Winter Olympics
Cross-country skiers at the 1964 Winter Olympics
People from Prags
Sportspeople from Südtirol